John Linus Paschang (October 5, 1895 – March 21, 1999) was an American prelate of the Roman Catholic Church who served as bishop of the Diocese of Grand Island in Nebraska from 1951 to 1972.

Biography

Early life 
One of nine children, John Paschang was born on October 5, 1895, in Hemingford, Nebraska, to Casper and Gertrude (née Fisher) Paschang. Drawn to the religious life from high school, he studied at Conception Seminary College in Conception, Missouri, and at St. John's Seminary in Collegeville, Minnesota.

Priesthood 
Paschang was ordained to the priesthood by Bishop Joseph Francis Busch for the Diocese of Omaha on June 12, 1921. After serving as pastor of St. Rose of Lima Parish in Hooper, Nebraska (1921–1923), he furthered his studies at the Catholic University of America in Washington, D.C., from where he earned a doctorate in canon law. Paschang then served as pastor of Holy Cross Parish in Omaha from 1927 to 1951.

Bishop of Grand Island 
On July 28, 1951, Paschang was appointed the fourth bishop of the Diocese of Grand Island by Pope Pius XII. He received his episcopal consecration on October 9, 1951, from Archbishop Gerald Bergan, with Bishops Louis Kucera and Edward Hunkeler serving as co-consecrators. 

During his tenure, Paschang ordained 55 priests and established 33 churches, 15 parish houses, 13 schools, 11 parish centers, six convents, several rectories, and four hospital additions. He attended all four sessions of the Second Vatican Council  in Rome(1962–1965), but was privately opposed to some of the Council's more liberal reforms. He also earned a stockbroker's license to better his knowledge of financial investments for the church.

Retirement and legacy 
On July 25, 1972, Pope Paul VI accepted Paschang's resignation as bishop of the Diocese of Grand Island. Paschang founded the Damian Leper Relief Society in 1976. He moved to St. Joseph's Retirement Home in West Point, Nebraska, in 1993, and said Mass every day in his room until he was hospitalized at St. Francis Memorial Hospital in 1999. At the time of his death in West Point, on March 21, 1999 at age 103, John Paschang was the world's oldest living Catholic bishop.

References

1895 births
1999 deaths
Catholic University of America alumni
Conception Seminary College alumni
College of Saint Benedict and Saint John's University alumni
People from Box Butte County, Nebraska
Participants in the Second Vatican Council
20th-century Roman Catholic bishops in the United States
Roman Catholic Archdiocese of Omaha
Roman Catholic bishops of Grand Island
Clergy from Omaha, Nebraska
American centenarians
Men centenarians